The 2019 season was the Tennessee Titans' 50th in the National Football League (NFL) and their 60th overall. It marks the franchise's 23rd season in the state of Tennessee, their 22nd in Nashville and their second full season under head coach Mike Vrabel. Despite a 2–4 start resulting in the benching of quarterback Marcus Mariota, the Titans turned their season around with ex-Dolphins quarterback Ryan Tannehill. With the boost of Tannehill, what was a previously bottom-tier NFL offense transformed into one of its best, helping the Titans to a strong 7–3 finish, making them 9–7 for the fourth straight year and allowing for their return to the postseason after a one-year absence.

Riding the rushing champion Derrick Henry into the playoffs, the Titans defeated the defending Super Bowl champion New England Patriots in the Wild Card Round by a score of 20–13, advancing them to the Divisional Round. The Titans then upset the heavily favored top-seeded Baltimore Ravens 28–12, advancing to their first AFC Championship Game since 2002, and becoming the first team since both the New York Jets and Green Bay Packers in 2010 to advance to a Conference Championship Game as a sixth seed. However, the Titans' Cinderella season came to an end when they fell to the eventual Super Bowl LIV champion Kansas City Chiefs 35–24 in the AFC Championship Game.

Coaching changes
On January 8, 2019, Titans offensive coordinator Matt LaFleur was hired as the head coach of the Green Bay Packers. On January 21, 2019, Titans tight ends coach Arthur Smith was promoted to the role of offensive coordinator.

Draft

Undrafted free agents

Source:

Staff

Final roster

Team captains
Marcus Mariota (QB)
Ben Jones (C)
Jurrell Casey (DL)
Wesley Woodyard (LB)
Kevin Byard (FS)

Preseason

Regular season

Schedule

Note: Intra-division opponents are in bold text.

Game summaries

Week 1: at Cleveland Browns

Though favored to lose, the Titans surprised the league with a blowout win over the heavily hyped Browns in Cleveland with a strong second-half performance. The Titans defense intercepted QB Baker Mayfield three times, including once for a pick-six by CB Malcolm Butler, and sacked Mayfield four times, including once for a safety by Cameron Wake. Titans QB Marcus Mariota and RB Derrick Henry had efficient games, leading the team to four touchdowns on offense to complement the strong defensive performance.

Week 2: vs. Indianapolis Colts

The Titans lost a close game 19–17, though a highlight of the game involved a passing touchdown from Mariota to offensive lineman David Quessenberry, who had recovered from a bout with cancer.

Week 3: at Jacksonville Jaguars

The Titans faced traditional rival Jacksonville in a Thursday night matchup for the fifth time in six years, but lost after an effective performance by Jaguars quarterback Gardner Minshew. With their second straight loss, the Titans fell to 1–2.

Week 4: at Atlanta Falcons

For the first time all season, Marcus Mariota was not sacked during a game, after being sacked a league-high 17 times in the first three games of the season. The Titans easily won 24–10 to improve to 2–2, despite Falcons QB Matt Ryan throwing for nearly 400 yards.

Week 5: vs. Buffalo Bills

In a defense-heavy game, the Titans fell short partly due to four missed field goals from kicker Cairo Santos, who was released after this game. However, the offense was also held in check by a strong Bills defense, as Mariota was sacked five times despite offensive tackle Taylor Lewan returning from suspension. With their third straight loss to Buffalo, Tennessee fell to 2–3 on the year.

Week 6: at Denver Broncos

After an ineffective performance, Marcus Mariota was benched for backup quarterback Ryan Tannehill in the third quarter as the Titans were shut out 16–0. With the loss, Tennessee fell to 2–4.

Week 7: vs. Los Angeles Chargers

Ryan Tannehill made his first start at quarterback for the Titans in place of Marcus Mariota. After a back-and-forth first half, the Titans pulled ahead in the second half, holding a 23–13 fourth quarter lead before the Chargers scored a touchdown, cutting the Titans' lead to 3 with just over 5 minutes left. After forcing the Titans to turn the ball over on downs at the Los Angeles 49-yard line, the Chargers marched down the field to the Titans 1-yard line, but running backs Austin Ekeler and Melvin Gordon were unable to score, with the Titans defense forcing Gordon to fumble at the goal line. The Titans recovered the ball for a touchback, effectively sealing the win to improve to 3–4.

Week 8: vs. Tampa Bay Buccaneers

The Titans rallied after the Buccaneers had themselves rallied from a 17–9 Tennessee lead.  Jameis Winston's two touchdowns and a two-point conversion throw put the Buccaneers up 23–17 halfway through the third quarter.  Cody Parkey's field goal put the Titans within 23–20 late in the third then Ryan Tannehill led a drive ending in an A. J. Brown touchdown catch that put Tennessee up 27–23.  Winston fumbled on one Buccaneers possession, then was intercepted on Tampa's final possession.

Week 9: at Carolina Panthers

Week 10: vs. Kansas City Chiefs

The game lead tied or changed six times and the Titans rallied to the win on two field goal miscues by the Chiefs, first on a blown snap, subsequent missed throw by Dustin Colquitt, and resulting intentional grounding penalty while Tennessee trailed 32–27, then following an Adam Humphries touchdown catch and Ryan Tannehill two-point conversion run, on a blocked Harrison Butker 52-yard attempt, the kick blocked by Joshua Kalu.   It was the Titans’ eighth win in nine matchups to that point over teams coached by Andy Reid.

Week 12: vs. Jacksonville Jaguars

This game was notable because the four touchdowns scored by the Titans in the third quarter came in a span of six offensive plays.

Week 13: at Indianapolis Colts

Week 14: at Oakland Raiders

In a game with heavy playoff implications, the Titans scored three unanswered touchdowns in the second half after being locked in a 21–21 tie with the Raiders at halftime. Tennessee finished with 551 total yards as Ryan Tannehill passed for nearly 400 yards and Derrick Henry also posted a strong performance. With the win, the Titans improved to 8–5, reaching a tie with the Pittsburgh Steelers for the sixth seed in the AFC.

Week 15: vs. Houston Texans

Week 16: vs. New Orleans Saints

Week 17: at Houston Texans

With this win, the Titans clinched the #6 seed in the AFC. They also won their first game in Houston since 2011.

RB Derrick Henry achieved the most rushing yards in the league, surpassing Browns RB Nick Chubb.

Standings

Division

Conference

Postseason

Schedule

Game summaries

AFC Wild Card Playoffs: at (3) New England Patriots

Tennessee running back Derrick Henry accounted for 204 of the Titans' 272 total offensive yards, including 34 carries for 182 yards and a touchdown as he led his team to victory as the Patriots failed to win a playoff game in a season for the first time since 2010. As a result, New England's streak of AFC Championship appearances ended at eight.

New England took the opening kickoff and drove 57 yards in 8 plays, the longest a 21-yard completion from Tom Brady to tight end Benjamin Watson. Nick Folk finished the drive with a 36-yard field goal to put the Patriots up 3–0. Tennessee struck back, with Henry carrying the ball 6 times for 44 yards on a 75-yard drive, that gave the team a 7–3 lead with Ryan Tannehill's 12-yard touchdown pass to Anthony Firkser, the first playoff touchdown scored by a Harvard University graduate. New England then moved the ball 75 yards in 10 plays, featuring a 25-yard run by Sony Michel. Receiver Julian Edelman finished the drive with a 5-yard touchdown run – his first such touchdown – on an end around play on the first play of the second quarter, giving the Patriots a 10–7 lead. Later on, Patriots receiver Mohamed Sanu returned a punt 23 yards to the Titans' 47-yard line, and the team drove on to a first and goal on the 1-yard line. The Titans held out on the goal line; linebacker Rashaan Evans dropped Michel for a 1-yard loss on first down, Rex Burkhead was tackled on the 1-yard line by Evans and DaQuan Jones on second down and Evans tackled Michel for a 2-yard loss on third down. The Patriots took a 13–7 lead on Folk's 21-yard field goal with 2:16 left in the half. Henry took off for a 29-yard gain on the first play of the team's ensuing drive, before picking up 23 more yards with his next three carries after an incompletion. Henry then ran a screen pass 22 yards to the Patriots' 1-yard line, ultimately converting a 1-yard touchdown run to give the Titans a 14–13 halftime lead.

This would turn out to be the last offensive score of the game, as both teams combined for a total of 9 punts in the second half. New England got a mild scoring chance when Duron Harmon intercepted a pass from Tannehill – who finished with 72 passing yards – at New England's 41-yard line, but the offense could only move the ball to Tennessee's 47-yard line before being forced to punt. In the final minute of the game, Tennessee punter Brett Kern's 58-yard kick pinned the Patriots back at their own 1-yard line. On the next play, Titans defensive back Logan Ryan, who formerly played for New England, intercepted Brady's pass and returned it for a 9-yard touchdown, making the final score 20–13 after a failed two-point conversion attempt. Ryan's pick-six would end up being Brady's final pass as a Patriot, as he would leave the Patriots in the offseason to sign with the Tampa Bay Buccaneers.

AFC Divisional Playoffs: at (1) Baltimore Ravens

Tennessee stunned the heavily favored Ravens, who had the NFL's best record and had finished the year as the league's top scoring team, while also setting a new record for rushing yards in a season. Once again, Titans running back Derrick Henry accounted for most of the Tennessee offense, accounting for 205 of their 300 total yards. Meanwhile, Baltimore racked up 530 yards, but their three turnovers and four failed fourth-down conversion attempts proved too much to overcome. As a result, Baltimore became the first number 1 seed in the playoffs to lose to the number 6 seed since the New England Patriots lost to the New York Jets in 2010.

On the Ravens' first drive of the game, Lamar Jackson threw a pass that bounced off the hands of Mark Andrews and was intercepted by safety Kevin Byard, who returned it 31 yards, with an unnecessary roughness penalty against Jackson for a horse-collar tackle adding another 15 yards and giving Tennessee a first down on the Ravens' 35-yard line. Henry then carried the ball 4 times for 22 yards on an 8-play drive that ended with Ryan Tannehill's 12-yard touchdown pass to tight end Jonnu Smith, who made a leaping one-handed catch in the back of the end zone. After getting the ball back, Baltimore drove to a 4th-and-1 on their own 45-yard line. Jackson attempted to convert with a quarterback sneak, but he was tackled by linebacker David Long Jr. for no gain on the last play of the first quarter. On the next play, Tannehill gave the team a 14–0 lead with a 45-yard touchdown pass to Kalif Raymond. Following a punt from each team, Jackson completed a 30-yard pass to Marquise Brown and a 16-yard pass to Andrews, setting up Justin Tucker's 49-yard field goal to make the score 14–3. Then after a Titans punt, Jackson completed a 26-yard pass to Seth Roberts, as well as two completions to Brown for gains of 16 yards and 38 yards on a 91-yard drive. Tucker finished it off with a 22-yard field goal as time expired in the half, making the score 14–6 at halftime.

Baltimore took the second half kickoff and drove to a 4th-and-1 on the Titans' 18-yard line. Jackson again tried to convert with a run, but was stopped for no gain by linebacker Harold Landry. Two plays later on 3rd and 1, Henry took a handoff through the middle and ran for a 66-yard gain, to the Ravens' 6-yard line. Then when faced with 3rd and goal from the 3-yard line, Henry took a direct snap out of wildcat formation and threw a jump pass to Corey Davis for a touchdown. This gave Tennessee a 21–6 lead and made Henry the first running back to throw a touchdown pass in the postseason since Allen Rice in the 1987 season. On the first play of the Ravens' next possession, defensive end Jurrell Casey forced a fumble while sacking Jackson, which Jeffery Simmons recovered for Tennessee on the Baltimore 20-yard line. From there, the Titans drove to a 28–6 lead, scoring on a 6-play drive that ended with Tannehill's 1-yard touchdown run. Baltimore responded with a drive to the Titans' 36-yard line, only to lose the ball again with a Jackson pass that was intercepted by safety Kenny Vaccaro. After forcing Tennessee to punt, the Ravens finally managed to score a touchdown, moving the ball 83 yards in 10 plays, the longest a 27-yard run by Jackson. Jackson finished the drive with a 15-yard touchdown pass to tight end Hayden Hurst, but his subsequent two-point conversion pass was incomplete, keeping the score at 28–12. Tennessee's defense then pinned down Baltimore for the rest of the game, forcing a turnover on downs on the Ravens' final two possessions.

Henry finished the game with 30 carries for 195 yards, while also catching two passes for 7 yards and throwing a 3-yard touchdown pass. He became the first player to rush for over 180 yards twice in the same postseason. Tannehill completed 7 of 14 pass attempts for 88 yards, and two touchdowns, while also rushing for 13 yards and a touchdown; Casey had four tackles, two sacks and a forced fumble. Jackson completed 31 of 59 passes for 365 yards and a touchdown, with two interceptions, while also rushing 20 times for 143 yards. This made him the first quarterback to throw for 300 yards and rush for 100 yards in a playoff game. His top receiver was Brown, who caught seven passes for 126 yards.

AFC Championship: at (2) Kansas City Chiefs

The Titans reached the AFC Championship Game for the first time since 2002, when they faced the Oakland Raiders, also making this the first AFC title game since then to not feature the Indianapolis Colts, New England Patriots, or Pittsburgh Steelers.

Miscellaneous
The Titans had the NFL's worst Field Goal kicking unit in 2019, going only 8 for 18 (.444) during the regular season.
The 8 field goals made tied the NFL record for fewest in a 16-game season.

References

External links

Tennessee
Tennessee Titans seasons
Tennessee Titans